Tokyo's 9th district is a single-member constituency of the House of Representatives, the lower house of the national Diet of Japan.

It was won by the Constitutional Democratic Party in the 2021 Japanese general election.

Members

References 

1994 establishments in Japan
Constituencies established in 1994
Districts of the House of Representatives (Japan)
Politics of Tokyo